Łukasz Chyła (born 31 March 1981 in Dziemiany) is a track and field sprint athlete who competes internationally for Poland.

Chyła represented Poland at the 2008 Summer Olympics in Beijing. He competed at the 4x100 metres relay together with Marcin Jędrusiński, Dariusz Kuć and Marcin Andrzej Nowak. In their qualification heat they did not finish due to a mistake in the baton exchange and they were eliminated.

Competition record

References

External links 
 
 
 
 
 

1981 births
Living people
Olympic athletes of Poland
Athletes (track and field) at the 2004 Summer Olympics
Athletes (track and field) at the 2008 Summer Olympics
Polish male sprinters
People from Kościerzyna County
European Athletics Championships medalists
Sportspeople from Pomeranian Voivodeship
20th-century Polish people
21st-century Polish people